All My Kingdoms (Opus I) is the debut album by German power metal band Heavatar.

The songs are inspired by classical composers Ludwig van Beethoven, Johann Sebastian Bach, Niccolò Paganini and Georges Bizet.

Track listing

Personnel 
Band members
David Vogt – bass guitar
Jörg Michael – drums
Sebastian Scharf – lead guitar
Stefan Schmidt – lyrics, music, vocals, rhythm guitar, producer

Choir
Bastian Emig
Dennis Schunke
Inga Scharf
Ingo Sterzinger
Olaf Senkbeil
Ross Thompson
Hacky Hackmann

Crew
Thomas Ewerhard – logo artwork
Kerm Beyit – cover artwork
Saskia Horländer – photography
Tim Rochels – photography
Dynamedion – orchestration on track 8

References 

2013 debut albums
Heavatar albums